Kisaki is a small town in eastern Tanzania.

Transport 

It is served by a small station on the TAZARA railway.

See also 

 Railway stations in Tanzania

References 

Populated places in Morogoro Region